Dieter Rucht (born 26 June 1946 in Kempten) is a German sociologist. He is known for his contributions to the protest and social movement literature. Until his retirement in June 2011, he was co-director of the research group Civil Society, Citizenship, and Political Mobilization in Europe at the Social Science Research Center Berlin (WZB) and (since 2001) honorary professor at the institute of sociology of the Free University of Berlin (department of political and social sciences).

Rucht taught and conducted research in Munich, Berlin, Cambridge (Harvard University), Paris (EHESS) and Ann Arbor (University of Michigan).

Publications (selection) 
 as an editor jointly with Donatella della Porta and Hanspeter Kriesi: Social Movements in a Globalizing world. London: Palgrave Macmillan, 2009, ; 023023531X 
 as an editor jointly with Wim Van De Donk, Brian D. Loader and Paul G. Nixon:  Cyberprotest: New media, citizens and social movements. London: Routledge, 2004
 as an editor jointly with Stefaan Walgrave: The World Says No to War. University of Minnesota, Minneapolis/London 2010, 
Modernisierung und neue soziale Bewegungen. Deutschland, Frankreich und USA im Vergleich. Campus-Verlag, Frankfurt am Main u. a. 1997,  (Theorie und Gesellschaft 32)

Living people
German sociologists
1946 births
University of Michigan faculty
German male writers